Kangaskorpi is a surname. Notable people with the surname include:

Jokke Kangaskorpi (1972–2009), Finnish footballer
Juuso Kangaskorpi (born 1975), Finnish footballer and manager

Finnish-language surnames